The Maharashtra State Road Development Corporation Limited (Marathi: महाराष्ट्र राज्यमार्ग विकास महामंडळ मर्यादित), commonly abbreviated as MSRDC, is an Indian public limited company fully owned by the Government of Maharashtra. MSRDC was established on July 9, 1996 and incorporated as a public limited company under the Companies Act 1956 on August 2, 1996. It is responsible for developing, building and maintaining roads in Maharashtra.

MSRDC completed its 25th anniversary on 9 July 2021.

The roles and responsibilities of the MSRDC are listed as:
"MSRDC is charged with the responsibility of planning, designing, constructing and managing select road projects, flyovers, bridges, light rail transit, sea links and water transport etc. in Maharashtra and integrated road development projects in select cities of the state. It also provides roadside amenities and any other infrastructure tasks specifically assigned to it."

Departments
The MSRDC has following departments:
Administration
Engineering
Toll Monitoring
Land & Surveys
Accounts & Finance
Commercial
Special Planning Authority

Projects

Completed projects
Mumbai-Pune Expressway
Bandra-Worli Sea Link
Airoli Bridge
Four Laning of NH-4 stretch between Satara and Kolhapur
41 flyovers & allied structures in Mumbai Metropolitan Region
Skywalks in Mumbai
Ghodbunder Road
Bhiwandi-Kalyan Shilphata Road
Santa Cruz–Chembur Link Road(SCLR)
Jogeshwari–Vikhroli Link Road(JVLR)
IRDP-Integrated City Road Development projects

Current projects
 Mumbai-Nagpur Expressway (Maharashtra Samruddhi Mahamarg)
 Mumbai-Pune Expressway (Missing Link)
 Thane Creek Bridge-3

Ongoing Projects (Construction/Operation & Maintenance)
Integrated Road Development Projects (IRDPs) for Solapur, Latur, Pune, Aurangabad and Nagpur

Future planning 

Jalna-Nanded Expressway
Pune-Nashik Industrial Expressway
Pune-Chhatrapati Sambhajinagar Expressway
Konkan Greenfield Expressway
MTNL-LBS elevated corridor
Nagpur–Goa Shaktipeeth Expressway
Thane-Borivali Tunnel
 Vakola-Kurla elevated corridor
Versova–Bandra Sea Link
 Virar-Alibaug Multi-Modal Corridor (MMC)

References

External links
Official MSRDC website

State agencies of Maharashtra
Roads in Maharashtra
Transport organisations based in India
1996 establishments in Maharashtra
Government agencies established in 1996